Corma Inc. is a manufacturer of corrugated plastic pipe production systems headquartered near Toronto, Canada. The company's headquarters and principal manufacturing plant are located in Concord, Ontario. Corma also maintains its own aluminum alloy foundry, located in Forest, Ontario, where it forms the mold blocks used in its corrugators.

Corma is active in corrugated plastic pipe manufacturing and infrastructure projects in the developing world, particularly in established and emerging markets worldwide.

History
Corma's first M600 corrugated plastic pipe-making machine, also known as a corrugator, was delivered to Akatherm in Saint John, New Brunswick, in 1974. In 1978, Corma applied for their first patents in double-wall pipe production and vacuum forming. Over the years Corma received patents for mold block technologies, Internal pipe cooling, inline coupling, and many other quality enhancing technologies. In total, Corma has applied for, and received, more than 300 patents since 1973.

In 2006, Corma established the Corma Shanghai Co. Ltd. sales/service office and manufacturing centre in the People's Republic of China. Corma Deutschland is expanded to become a full, sales and service center supporting customers in Europe, Africa and the Middle East.

Patents
Corma Inc. holds over 300 patents related to corrugators. The company continues to defend its patents from infringement by other companies.

Awards and recognition
 2012 – Her Majesty Queen Elizabeth II Diamond Jubilee Medal
 2012 - Vaughan Chamber of Commerce – Business of the Year Award – Exporter
 2011 - Vaughan Chamber of Commerce – Business of the Year Award – Technological Excellence
 2010 - Federation des Plastiques et Alliances Composites, Honoris Innova Award – Commercialization.
 2009 - Vaughan Chamber of Commerce – Exporter of the Year Award
 2007 - CPIA Canadian Plastics Industry Association – Leader of the Year Award – Manfred Lupke – CEO of Corma
 2005 - Vaughan Chamber of Commerce – Exporter of the Year Award
 2003 - Vaughan Chamber of Commerce – Company of the Year Award
 2001 - Vaughan Chamber of Commerce – Exporter of the year Award, Finalist
 2000 - Vaughan Chamber of Commerce – Exporter of the year Award, Finalist
 2000 - President's Award – Poland
 1999 - Vaughan Chamber of Commerce – Exporter of the year Award
 1998 - CPPA Special Achievement Award

References

External links
 

Manufacturing companies established in 1973
Manufacturing companies based in Toronto
1973 establishments in Ontario